Beau Geste is a BBC television serial, based on the 1924 novel by P. C. Wren. The series aired on BBC1 from 31 October to 19 December 1982 and starred Benedict Taylor, Anthony Calf and Jonathon Morris as the three brothers.

Plot

Although minor plot points separate the versions, all of the versions share a common element of a stolen gem, which one of the Geste brothers, Beau Geste, is thought to have stolen from his adoptive family. This version, unlike the Hollywood movies, stays true to the book, in that the three young brothers join the legion, are later commanded by Sergeant Major Lejaune (not Markov, as in one of the Hollywood versions), and this TV adaptation contains the scene from the book where the surrounded Legionnaires defiantly sing Le Boudin. The Legionnaires' equipment is spot-on too, right down to the correct mess-tins and bayonets. Filmed entirely in England, at various locations, with its desert scenes being filmed in a sand pit in Dorset.

Cast
 Benedict Taylor: Michael 'Beau' Geste
 Anthony Calf: Digby Geste
 Jonathon Morris: John Geste
 Andrew Armour: Recruiting Sgt. Major
 Sally Baxter: Isobel
 Lucy Benjamin: Young Claudia (as Lucy Baker)
 Jonathan Burn: Colonna
 John Cannon: Legionnaire
 Nicolas Chagrin: St. Andre
 John Challis: Cpl. Dupre
 Julia Chambers: Claudia
 Les Conrad: Legionnaire
 Robin Crane: Young Digby
 Paul Critchley: Young John
 Barry Dennen: Buddy
 Harry Fielder: Legionnaire
 John Forgeham: Sgt. Maj. Lejaune
 Nadio Fortune: Guantaio
 Pat Gorman: Legionnaire
 Stefan Gryff: Boldini
 Terry Gurry: Corporal
 Paul Hawkins: Young Beau
 Randal Herley: Recruiting Officer
 Andrew Lodge: Glock
 Christopher Malcolm: Hank
 Red Milner: Legionnaire
 John Moreno: Maris
 Kenneth Owens: Brandt
 Daniel André Pageon: Vauren (as Daniel Pageon)
 John Patrick: Rastignac
 Sian Pattenden: Young Isobel
 Maurice Quick: Burdon
 Terry Raven: Indian Gentleman
 Bunny Reed: Schwartz
 Christopher Reilly: Young Augustus
 John Repsch: Corporal
 Jon Rumney: Bolidar
 David Shawyer: Sgt. Maj. Dufour
 Philip Shelley: Augustus Brandon
 Barry Summerford: Legionnaire
 David Sumner: Maj. Henri de Beaujolais
 Damien Thomas: Capt. Renouf
 Robert Vowles: Guard Corporal
 Wendy Williams: Lady Brandon

External links

1982 British television series debuts
1982 British television series endings
1980s British drama television series
BBC television dramas
Television shows based on British novels
1980s British television miniseries
English-language television shows
French Foreign Legion in popular culture
Television shows set in Dorset